William Goulding (3 March 1813 – 11 June 1878) was an English first-class cricketer.

Goulding was born at Enfield in March 1813. A club cricketer for St John's Wood, Goulding played first-class cricket for Middlesex twice in 1851, against the Marylebone Cricket Club (MCC) at Lord's and Surrey at The Oval, scoring 14 runs across both matches. He later made a single first-class appearance for the MCC against Middlesex at Lord's in 1862, making a single stumping in his capacity as wicket-keeper. Goulding died at Hampstead in June 1878.

References

External links

1813 births
1878 deaths
People from Enfield, London
English cricketers
Middlesex cricketers
Marylebone Cricket Club cricketers